Auguste Mambour (1896–1968) was a Belgian painter.

1896 births
1968 deaths
Artists from Liège
Belgian poster artists
20th-century Belgian painters